Insein is the name of several places in Burma:

Insein Township
Insein, Kale
Insein Prison